Dimethyl acetylenedicarboxylate (DMAD) is an organic compound with the formula CH3O2CC2CO2CH3. It is a di-ester in which the ester groups are conjugated with a C-C triple bond.  As such, the molecule is highly electrophilic, and is widely employed as a dienophile in cycloaddition reactions, such as the Diels-Alder reaction.  It is also a potent Michael acceptor. This compound exists as a colorless liquid at room temperature. This compound was used in the preparation of nedocromil.

Preparation
Although inexpensively available, DMAD is prepared today as it was originally. Maleic acid is brominated and the resulting dibromosuccinic acid is dehydrohalogenated with potassium hydroxide yielding acetylenedicarboxylic acid.  The acid is then esterified with methanol and sulfuric acid as a catalyst:

Safety
DMAD is a lachrymator and a vesicant.

References

Alkyne derivatives
Methyl esters
Carboxylate esters